Triethylsilane is the organosilicon compound with the formula (C2H5)3SiH. It is a trialkylsilane. The Si-H bond is reactive. This colorless liquid is used in organic synthesis as a reducing agent and as a precursor to silyl ethers.  As one of the simplest trialkylsilanes that is a liquid at room temperature, triethylsilane is often used in studies of hydrosilylation catalysis.

Additional reading

References

Reducing agents
Carbosilanes